Gianni De Magistris (born 3 December 1950 in Florence, Italy) is a retired Italian water polo player. He was part of Italian teams that won the world title in 1978, a silver medal at the 1976 Olympics, and two bronze medals, at the 1975 world and 1977 European championships.

Magistris played in five consecutive Summer Olympics for Italy from 1968 to 1984 (at the 1976 games, younger brother Riccardo was among his teammates). He is the third athlete to compete in water polo at five Olympics, after Briton Paul Radmilovic and Hungarian Dezső Gyarmati. He is among the first ten Italians to compete at five Olympics. He is also a leading scorer in Olympic water polo history, with 59 goals.

See also
 Italy men's Olympic water polo team records and statistics
 List of athletes with the most appearances at Olympic Games
 List of players who have appeared in multiple men's Olympic water polo tournaments
 List of Olympic medalists in water polo (men)
 List of men's Olympic water polo tournament top goalscorers
 List of world champions in men's water polo
 List of World Aquatics Championships medalists in water polo
 List of members of the International Swimming Hall of Fame
 Legends of Italian sport - Walk of Fame

References

External links
 

1950 births
Italian male water polo players
Olympic silver medalists for Italy in water polo
Water polo players at the 1968 Summer Olympics
Water polo players at the 1972 Summer Olympics
Water polo players at the 1976 Summer Olympics
Water polo players at the 1980 Summer Olympics
Water polo players at the 1984 Summer Olympics
Sportspeople from Florence
Living people
Medalists at the 1976 Summer Olympics
World Aquatics Championships medalists in water polo
Italian water polo coaches